Khudaganj is a town and a nagar panchayat in Tehsil Tilhar Shahjahanpur district in the Indian state of Uttar Pradesh.

Geography 

It has an average elevation of 144 metres (472 feet).The Main river of Khudaganj is Deoaha(Khakra). A famous place in the town is Pakka Talab. It is famous for a sweet – "Khudaganj ki khurchan"Rs 440 Kg  – which is made from milk and sugar. Chote Bade ki Dukan is famous for this sweet. 
Khudaganj is a block of Shahjahanpur district Tehsil Tilhar surrounded by the farm fields
There are more than five schools such as Lala Hari Ram Inter College, Zila Parishad inter college, etc. Best Hindi medium school on the basis of study is Lala Hari Ram Inter College. There are four banks in Khudaganj: S.B.I Baroda Bank, Kshetriye Gramin Bank (1,2).

Demographics 
 India census, Khudaganj had a population of 11,844. Males constitute 53% of the population and females 47%. Khudaganj has an average literacy rate of 47%, lower than the national average of 59.5%: male literacy is 55%, and female literacy is 38%. In Khudaganj, 18% of the population is under 6 years of age.

References 

Cities and towns in Shahjahanpur district